Ortayazı can refer to:

 Ortayazı, Ergani
 Ortayazı, Suluova